NEVS AB (an abbreviated form of "National Electric Vehicle Sweden") is a Swedish electric car manufacturer which acquired the assets of Saab Automobile from a bankruptcy estate in 2012. NEVS is the trademark of the company's products including the first electric vehicle based on the 9-3 platform which was to start in 2017.

History
On 31 August 2012, NEVS acquired the main assets of the Saab Automobile bankruptcy estates. 

In December 2015 the company signed a strategic collaboration agreement with the Chinese company Panda New Energy, an energy vehicle leasing company that focuses on limiting emissions. According to the agreement, NEVS will provide Panda with 150,000 9-3 sedan electric vehicles until the end of 2020.

NEVS signed a battery contract with Contemporary Amperex Technology in 2017.

In 2017, DiDi announced to place a SEK 4 billion order. However, the agreement was collapsed.

Koenigsegg has since then bought the stake back from NEVS.

Owners and management
Chinese real estate conglomerate Evergrande Group, via its listed subsidiary: Evergrande Health Industry Group (Evergrande Health; SEHK:708), acquired 51% of the shares in NEVS in January 2019.

In July 2020, Evergrande Health announced plans to privatizate NEVS by acquiring all the shares of NEVS. The company also announced a rebranding to China Evergrande New Energy Vehicle Group.

In 2021, it was reported that Evergrande was deep in debt and so was trying to sell NEVS to various Chinese investment firms, such as the Xiaomi Consortium. If all of Evergrande's automobile division is sold to a new owner, it is likely that sister brand Hengchi will be the marque that will survive, as NEVS has struggled to put their version of the Saab 9-3 into production at their Tianjin plant.

Products
NEVS currently only sells vehicles in China.

Current vehicles
 9-3 2012-2015 (under Saab name), 2017-present (under NEVS name), a compact electric sedan based on the Saab 9-3.
 The Sango, a prototype self-driving 6 passenger vehicle for city mobility.

See also
Faraday Future
Hengchi
Sono Motors

References

External links
 Official NEVS website

Electric vehicle manufacturers of Sweden
Companies based in Västra Götaland County
Saab